Anna Radius Zuccari (May 7, 1846 – July 13, 1918) was an Italian writer who used the pen name Neera.

Biography
The daughter of Fermo Zuccari, an architect, she was born Anna Zuccari in Milan and grew up in Caravaggio. Her mother died when she was ten and she was raised by two older unmarried aunts from her father's family. Her father died when she was twenty. In 1871, she married the banker Emilio Radius. She published her first short story in 1875 in the publication Il Pungolo. Zuccari contributed to various magazines and journals, such as Rivista d'Italia,  and L'Idea Liberale. In 1890, she founded the journal Vita Intima.

Despite her career as a successful author, it was Zuccari's view that a woman's place was in the home, which she called "real feminism".

She died in Milan of cancer at the age of 72, being confined to bed by her illness. During the period before her death, she dictated her memoirs which were published after her death as Una giovinezza del secolo XIX (Portrait of a 19th-century youth).

Selected works 

 Un romanzo (A novel) (1876)
 Addio! (Farewell), novel (1877)
 Il castigo (The punishment) (1881)
 Dizionario d'igiene per le famiglie (Dictionary of hygiene for families), instructional (1881), with Paolo Mantegazza
 Teresa, novel (1886)
 Lydia, novel (1887)
 L'indomani (The day after), novel (1890)
 Il libro di mio figlio, essays (1891)
 Battaglie per un'idea, essays (1897)
 Battaglie per un'idea, essays (1898)
 Le idee di una donna (The idea of a woman) (1903)

References 

1846 births
1918 deaths
20th-century Italian novelists
Italian essayists
Italian women essayists
Writers from Milan
Deaths from cancer in Lombardy
20th-century essayists
20th-century Italian women writers
20th-century pseudonymous writers
19th-century Italian novelists
19th-century Italian women writers
19th-century essayists
19th-century pseudonymous writers
Pseudonymous women writers